The Hall of Guanyin or Guanyin Hall ( or ) is the most important annex halls in Chinese Buddhist temples and mainly for enshrining Guanyin (Avalokiteśvara). Guanyin, also called "Guanshiyin", "Guanshizizai", "Guanzizai", etc., is the attendant of Amitabha and one of the "Western Three Saints". Guanyin is renowned for his mercy and sympathy. According to Chapter of the Universal Gate of Avalokiteśvara Bodhisattva, if people are in danger, they just need to call his name and he will hear them and go to save them. Since he has many manifestations, different places enshrine different statues of Saint Guanyin, Guanzizai, and Thousand-armed and eyed Guanyin.

Statues

Saint Guanyin

Statue of Saint Guanyin sits in the lotus posture with a lotus or the Yujingping in hand, wearing Keyura, necklaces and decorations and a precious crown on the head. There is a sitting statue of Amitabha on the crown, which is the main symbol of Guanyin.

Guanzizai

Statue of Guanzizai sits with on leg crossing and one leg dropping. The Yujingping full of sweet dew and a willow branch is placed near him, representing his mercy and sympathy to spread to all the people. A boy and a girl serve as his attendants on his two sides. The boy is Sudhana (Shancai Tongzi) and the girl is Longnü.

Thousand-armed and eyed Guanyin

Thousand-armed and eyed Guanyin, has thousands of arms on both sides of the body. For statues, there are often 42 hands with one eye in each to symbolize the thousand hands. The middle two hands are in closing palm posture and other hands are holding Vajras, sutra scrolls Dharma seals and other weapons. Guanyin's thousand hands mean to protect all living creatures and the eyes mean to view over the world.

References

Further reading

External links

Chinese Buddhist architecture
Guanyin temples